Sunn O))) (pronounced "sun") is an American experimental metal band formed in 1998 in Seattle, Washington. The band is known for their distinctive visual style and slow, heavy sound, which blends diverse genres including doom metal, drone, black metal, dark ambient, and noise rock, as well as for their extremely loud live performances. 

The band's core members are Stephen O'Malley (also of Khanate and Burning Witch) and Greg Anderson (of Goatsnake and Engine Kid).

History
Sunn O))) is named after the Sunn amplifier brand, the logo of which includes a circle next to the "sunn" banner with waves heading off to the right. In interviews, Stephen O'Malley stated that the band's moniker was also chosen as a play on the name Earth, a band widely regarded as pioneers of drone metal throughout the 1990s. Before the band members moved to Los Angeles, they briefly used the moniker Mars.

The band's style is characterized by slow tempos, distorted guitars, lack of rhythm and melody, and alternative tunings. The guitars are notable for their low register, frequently utilizing tunings as low as dropped A. Additionally, the band is known for using resonant feedback to create monolithic soundscapes and eerie atmospheres. Percussion is rarely incorporated, with a lack of any discernible beat. When performing live, the band wears robes, fills the air with fog, and plays at a high volume.

The band releases the majority of its music through the label it founded in 1998, Southern Lord Records. However, the band initially released ØØ Void (its second album) on multiple labels, including Rise Above Records, Hydra Head Records, and Dirter Productions (which pressed it as a double album on vinyl). Additionally, the original pressing of The Grimmrobe Demos was released by Hydra Head Records. It was later issued as a double picture record set by Outlaw Recordings and finally reissued by Southern Lord in 2004.

In 2008, Sunn O))) released a live album titled Dømkirke and also announced a mini-tour consisting of four concerts to commemorate the group's 10th anniversary, which coincided with the release of The Grimmrobe Demos.

On December 17, 2009, the song "Hunting & Gathering (Cydonia)" from the CD Monoliths & Dimensions was named the Heaviest Song of All-Time by Jason Ellis on The Jason Ellis Show on Sirius/XM. Greg Anderson then appeared on The Jason Ellis Show on January 12, 2010. Hungarian-born Attila Csihar (Mayhem) has performed live with the band as their primary vocalist since 2003.

Sunn O))) released a collaboration album with Ulver titled Terrestrials in February 2014: in October 2014, the band released the album Soused, a collaboration with singer-songwriter Scott Walker. In November 2015, Sunn O))) presented a four-day program at Le Guess Who? Festival in Utrecht, the Netherlands, including Annette Peacock, Magma, Julia Holter and The Crazy World of Arthur Brown, and Sunn O))) itself.

The band worked with producer Steve Albini on two albums, Life Metal and Pyroclasts.

Musical style
Sunn O)))'s musical style has been described as drone metal, doom metal, experimental metal black metal, noise rock, and dark ambient. Sunn O))) experiments with a variety of styles and sounds, progressing beyond the primarily guitar and bass style of The Grimmrobe Demos and ØØ Void. On White1 and White2, the band noticeably expanded on conceptualization by inviting several guests, resulting in everything from quiet meditative ambient sounds ("A Shaving of the Horn that Speared You" from White1) to a bizarre bass experiment track ("bassAliens" from White2). Black One continued in this direction, utilizing far more electronics, synthesizers, and other instrumentation than earlier Sunn O))) material, yet still marking a significant return to their traditional sound.

Sunn O))) is widely regarded as leaders in the genre, including by The New York Times Magazine of May 28, 2006, when the band was written up in an article called "Heady Metal" by John Wray. Sunn O))) also appeared in the August 2007 issue of Q magazine (the "loud issue"), with its album White1 being named the 18th-loudest album of all time, just above AC/DCs Back in Black and below Jimi Hendrix's Are You Experienced?

Discography

Studio albums
ØØ Void (2000)
Flight of the Behemoth (2002)
White1 (2003)
White2 (2004)
Black One (2005)
Monoliths & Dimensions (2009)
Kannon (2015)
Life Metal (2019)
Pyroclasts (2019)

Collaborative albums
Altar (with Boris) (2006)
Terrestrials (with Ulver) (2014)
Soused (with Scott Walker) (2014)

References

External links

 Southern Lord Records
 Stephen O'Malley official site
 

American avant-garde metal musical groups
Drone metal musical groups
Heavy metal musical groups from Washington (state)
1998 establishments in Washington (state)
Musical groups established in 1998
Musical groups from Seattle
Southern Lord Records artists
4AD artists
American musical duos
Heavy metal duos